Physaria purpurea, the western white bladderpod or rose bladderpod, is a perennial plant in the family Brassicaceae found in the Sonoran Desert.

References

purpurea